Zhangdian is the central urban district of Zibo city in Shandong province, China. It governs six towns, six subdistricts, 113 administrative villages, and 90 neighborhood committees. It has a registered population of 622,000, including an urban population of 480,400.

It contains the administrative offices of Zibo central government, and has major rail and bus stations. The outer area is highly industrialized. The central area is a mixture of high rise office buildings, condos, government offices and shopping malls. The Central Business District is located around People's Park.

History 
Zhangdian was derived from Longshan culture and Dawenkou culture.

In the period of Warring States, Yue Yi, a general of Yan was awarded this district. He then established the state of Chang in this area.

At the end of Jin Dynasty and the beginning of Yuan dynasty, Zhangdian became famous as a trade center. It had always been a city of significance for Yuan, Ming and Qing dynasty.

In April, 1955, Zhangdian was officially established as one of the districts of Zibo city.

Administrative division 
Zhangdian governs six towns, including Nanding, Fujia, Mashang, Fangzhen, Zhongbu and Fengshui.

It also governs six subdistricts, including Chezhan Subdistrict, Heping Subdistrict, Gongyuan Subdistrict, Keyuan Subdistrict, Tiyuchang Subdistrict and Xingyuan subdistrict.

Natural Environment

Landform 
Zhangdian is on the north east side of the synclinal basin of Zibo. It is located on a transition area from low mountains and hills to Huangfan plain, with its eastern and southern parts higher than its western and northern part. The land is generally plain in Zhangdian, with its plain covering 72.43% of its gross area.

There is a northeast-trending massif in the northeast part of Zhangdian, with Heitie Mountain as its main peak. Heitie Mountain is 254 meters high. It is also the highest mountain in Zhangdian.

Soil 
There are two kinds of soil in Zhangdian, cinnamon soil and Shajiang black soil.

River 
Xiaofu River, Zhulong River, Laozi River and Mansi River are the main rivers in Zhangdian. Their length inside Zhangdian district are respectively 17 kilometers, 21.8 kilometers, 30.6 kilometers and 6.8 kilometers. They are all north-trending except Zhulong River.

Climate 
Zhangdian has a temperate and monsoonal climate, with four clearly distinct seasons.

Tourist Attraction

Ceramics City 
Ceramics City is located on Zhangdian centre cultural square. It exhibits fancy porcelains from the Neolithic Age until now which were produced and discovered in Zibo. The museum hall is divided in seven parts: integrated exhibition area, ancient exhibition area, neoteric exhibition area...

Yudaihu scenic area 
Yudaihu scenic area is an integrated scenic area with the recreation tourism, agricultural ecology and food service.

Famous person 
Chinese physician——Bianque

Ming Dynasty physician——Yuehanzhen

Strategist——Sunbin

Qi politician——Guanzhong

Qi prime minister (in ancient China)——Baoshuya

References

External links
Official website

 https://www.sdta.cn/scenic/41.html

County-level divisions of Shandong
Zibo